Edmond Gore Alexander Holmes (1850–1936) was an educationalist, writer and poet.

Biography

Holmes was born in Moycashel, County Westmeath, Ireland.

His The Creed of the Buddha (1908) is well known; he also wrote a pantheist text All is One: A Plea for a Higher Pantheism.

In 1901 he was a school inspector. Katherine Bathurst who had a troubled career was transferred from Wales to work under his supervision. Disputes between them includes expenses, timetables and Bathurst's objections to Holmes amending her reports. The Oxford Education Committee complained about her and she was given six months probation in February 1904 and in the following month female inspectors were moved to a new organisation as proposed by Robert Morant. Bathurst was sent to Manchester.

Holmes rose to become chief inspector for elementary schools in 1905. He resigned in 1911, over a confidential memorandum criticising school inspectors who had formerly been elementary school teachers. This angered the teachers' union and it led to the downfall of Robert Morant the permanent secretary to the Board of Education when it became public.

Holmes subsequent writings on education are taken as an early statement of "progressive" and "child-centred" positions, and are still cited.  Later works come close to theosophy.  For example, even a 1914 book review of his In Defence of What Might Be describes it as "pregnant with possibilities for the untrammeled soul of the growing child. A draft of fresh air into static pedagogy."

Words from his The Triumph of Love were set to music by the composer Charles Villiers Stanford, a friend.

Personal life 
Holmes married Florence Mary Syme (d. 1927) in 1880 and they had three children, two daughters and a son. Daughter Verena Holmes went on to become a leading early woman engineer and only son Maurice Gerald Holmes(1885–1964) became a British civil servant.

Publications

Poems (1876) 
Poems (1879)  
A Confession of Faith. By an Unorthodox Believer (1895)
The Silence of Love (1901)
Walt Whitman's Poetry: A Study & A Selection (1902)
The Triumph of Love (1903) 
The Creed of Christ (1905)
The Creed of the Buddha (1908)
What Is and What Might Be (1911)
The Creed of My Heart (1912)  
In Defence of What Might Be (1914)
Sonnets to the Universe (1918) 
Sonnets and Poems 
Experience of Reality. A Study of Mysticism (1928) 
Philosophy Without Metaphysics (1930)
The Headquarters of Reality. A Challenge to Western Thought (1933).

References

Bibliography
Edmond Holmes and the Tragedy of Education (1998) Chris Shute.
Gordon, P. (1983). "The writings of Edmond Holmes: a reassessment and bibliography." History of Education 12(1): 15–24.
Gordon, P. (1978). "The Holmes-Morant Circular of 1911: A Note." Journal of Educational Administration and History X(1): 36–40.

External links
 
 

1850 births
1936 deaths
Irish educational theorists
Irish poets
Pantheists
People from County Westmeath